In restaurant terminology, a table d'hôte menu is a menu where multi-course meals with only a few choices are charged at a fixed total price. Such a menu may be called prix fixe ("fixed price"). The terms set meal and set menu are also used. The cutlery on the table may also already be set for all of the courses.

Table d'hôte contrasts with à la carte, where customers may order any of the separately priced menu items available.

Etymology
Table d'hôte is a French loan phrase that literally means "the host's table".

The meaning shifted to include any meal featuring a set menu at a fixed price. The use in English is documented as early as 1617, while the later extended use, now more common, dates from the early nineteenth century.

In France, the term began in inns where guests ate at a common table, called the "Host's table" (though the host typically did not sit with the guests). By the end of the seventeenth century, similar meals were being hosted by other eateries (cabarets and traiteurs), and were initially known as "inn's tables" (tables d'auberge). This practice of serving a set meal at a collective table became the most common (though not the only, as is sometimes claimed) way of dining in public in Paris before the restaurant appeared. Places which offered tables d'hôte sometimes also allowed à la carte ordering. In the nineteenth century, the term survived but often for service at individual tables. Some tables d'hôte were then elegant but unsavory places which attracted gamblers and others looking for unwary victims.

Country-specific practices
Many restaurants in the United States convert their menus to prix fixe only for special occasions. Generally, this practice is limited to holidays where entire families dine together, such as Easter and Thanksgiving, or on couple-centric holidays like Valentine's Day.

In France, table d'hôte refers to the shared dining (sometimes breakfast and lunch) offered in a vacation named chambre d'hôte (similar to "bed and breakfast"). Every guest of a chambre d'hôte can join this meal, cooked by the hosting family. It is not a restaurant, there is only one service, the price is fixed and usually included in the vacation. Everyone sits around a large table and makes small-talk about the house, the country, and so on.

What is closer in French to the meaning of table d'hôte in English is a menu ("lunch special" or "fixed menu"). It usually includes several dishes to pick in a fixed list: an entrée (introductory course), a main course (a choice between up to four dishes), a cheese, a dessert, bread, and sometimes beverage (wine) and coffee all for a set price fixed for the year between €15 to €55. The menu du jour, a cheaper version with less choice, an entrée and a main course, the plat du jour ("dish of the day") changed every day, is usually between €9 to €15.

In Belgium, restaurants in the medium to high price range tend to serve menus where the customer can compose a menu from a list of entrees, main courses and desserts. These dishes can be ordered separately and all have a different pricing depending on the ingredients used. However combined in a three-, five-, or seven-course menu, they will be served at a fixed pricing that is usually €10–15 cheaper than when ordered separately. Also in many cases, if a menu is chosen, it will be accompanied by amuses (little side dishes between the courses). Wine and other beverages are almost always excluded.

In Sweden, almost all restaurants—from the simplest diner to the finest luxury restaurant—serve Dagens rätt ("the daily dish") during lunch hours (on weekdays) at a much lower price than the same dish would cost at other times. Most commonly, there is a choice of two or three dishes: a meat/fish/poultry dish, a vegetarian alternative, and a pasta. Salad buffet, bread and butter and beverage are included, and sometimes also a simple starter, like a soup.

In India, the thali (meaning "plate") is very common in restaurants. The main course consisting of rice or roti (flat bread) and assorted side dishes and vegetables is arranged on a large plate. This may be followed by dessert. There may be more than one kind of thali—vegetarian, tandoori, deluxe—the name signifying the prix-fixe items as well as the price.

It may range in price from €8 to €30, with €10 being the average price.

In Romania, the most typical fixed-price menu is called daily menu, taken in the daytime.

In Russia, the most typical fixed-price menu is called business lunch (бизнес-ланч) or fixed lunch (комплексный обед), taken in the daytime.

This has a fixed menu and often comes with side dishes such as pickled vegetables and miso soup. Typical prices can range from ¥800 to ¥1,500.

In Korea, table d'hôte is also known as han-jeongsik.

In Italy, this is the typical practice in small rural restaurants called osterie (singular osteria, from oste meaning "host" as in the French hôte mentioned above). Osterie vary widely in what they offer, but most serve simple foods and wine sourced locally, and prepared according to the local practices. Other Italian restaurants offer a selection of antipasti at a fixed price; often enough to fare una tavola completa ("fill the table"). Diners enjoy an informal meal as they serve themselves various small portions family style.

In the United Kingdom, the format is often seen in casual dining restaurants or pub restaurants alongside an à la carte menu, where it is frequently used as a low-price alternative to entice more customers at quieter times (e.g., weekday lunchtimes). The format is also often found in the use of children's menus or on special occasions, such as a Christmas menu.

See also

 Combination meal
 Full course dinner
 List of French words and phrases used by English speakers

References

Bundled products or services
Restaurant menus
Restaurant terminology